Eva Waddell Mader Macdonald (7 October 1902 – 27 April 1997) was a Canadian medical professional at the Women's College Hospital. She began as a medical professor in hygiene before becoming the Director of Laboratories at WCH from 1945 to 1952. Outside of medicine, Macdonald was the chancellor of the University of Toronto from 1974 to 1977.

Early life and education
In 1902, Macdonald was born in Halifax, Nova Scotia. In 1927, she graduated from Dalhousie University and went to the University of Toronto with a health scholarship.  She received a Diploma in Public Health from the University of Toronto's Faculty of Medicine in 1929.

Career
In 1927, Macdonald began her medical career as an intern at Nova Scotia Sanatorium. After a brief stint at Nova Scotia Sanatorium, Macdonald began working at the Women's College Hospital in 1929. At the Women's College Hospital, Macdonald was a medical professor in hygiene for the University of Toronto until 1933. During her career, she held multiple positions for the Women's College Hospital, including Hospital Bacteriologist (1939–1945), Director of Laboratories (1945 to 1952), and Director of Hospital Health (1953–1968). During her time at Women's College Hospital, Macdonald co-developed, with Marion Hilliard, a simplified Pap test in partnership with W. L. Robinson of the Banting Institute. Alternatively, Macdonald began working as a private practitioner in 1952 and continued until 1962.

In 1963, Macdonald created an initiative called Operation Recall to convince former women doctors to return to their careers. Outside of her health career, Macdonald replaced Pauline McGibbon as the chancellor of the University of Toronto in 1974. Macdonald held the position of chancellor until 1977 and retired in 1978.

Awards and honours
In 1974, Macdonald was named alumna of the year of Dalhousie University Faculty of Medicine. In 1975, Macdonald was awarded an honorary Doctor of Humane Letters by Mount Saint Vincent University.

Personal life
Macdonald was married with two children.

Death
Macdonald died on 24 April 1997.

References

External links 
 Eva Mader Macdonald oral history interview held at the University of Toronto Archives and Records Management Services

1902 births
1997 deaths
Canadian medical academics
Chancellors of the University of Toronto
Date of death missing
Place of death missing